Nové Syrovice is a municipality and village in Třebíč District in the Vysočina Region of the Czech Republic. It has about 900 inhabitants.

Administrative parts
The village of Krnčice is an administrative part of Nové Syrovice.

Notable people
Johann Georg Grasel (1790–1818), robber and murderer

References

Villages in Třebíč District